The episodes of the British documentary Meerkat Manor first premiered on Animal Planet International in the United Kingdom on 12 September 2005. The programme was originally created by Caroline Hawkins, executive producer and series editor at Oxford Scientific Films, and commissioned for Animal Planet International by executive producer and commissioning editor Mark Wild.

The first 13-episode series concluded on 24 October 2005. With the success of the programme in the UK, Animal Planet began broadcasting Meerkat Manor on its national channels in Australia, Canada, and the United States. The programme premiered in the United States on 9 June 2006, with the first series airing through 25 August 2006. The second series aired simultaneously in both the US and the UK, starting 29 September 2006. The third series premiered in the US on 10 August 2007, followed in the UK on 10 September 2007, and in Canada on 3 October 2007. Because each channel had different broadcasting schedules, the UK sequence of new episodes ended well before those in the US and Canada. The fourth series premiered in the United States on 6 June 2008 with the subtitle of The Next Generation. It was originally slated to begin airing in the United Kingdom in February 2009, but the premiere was later moved to April 2009. In 2021, a fifth series with the subtitle Rise of the Dynasty was commissioned by BBC America from Oxford Scientific Films. The 13-part series was shown in the United Kingdom by Channel 5 in December 2021, every weekday in the 6.30pm slot, with the last episode going out on Wednesday 15 December 2021.

The original episodes are narrated by Bill Nighy. The Australian and American channels originally redubbed the episodes using their own narrators. the Australian episodes are narrated by Mike Goldman. In the US, episodes for the first three series were narrated by Sean Astin. For the fourth series, Astin was replaced with Stockard Channing, while BBC America kept Nighy as the narrator of the 2021 series for viewers in the United States. Meerkat Manor is also broadcast in more than 160 countries.

Notable merchandise based on the series include multiple DVD episode sets covering the first three series released in two regions, an upcoming feature film that will be a prequel to the Meerkat Manor series, and a book by Professor Tim Clutton-Brock entitled Meerkat Manor – The Story of Flower of the Kalahari.

As the programme originated in the United Kingdom, this article refers to seasons as series. In the case of changes made in the American broadcast, the title it aired under in the US will be listed below the original title, while meerkat name changes will be noted in the episode summary.

Episode list

Series 1: 2005

Series 2: 2006

Series 3: 2007

Series 4: 2008

Distribution

Online episodes
All episodes aired in the United States have been released for download from iTunes, except for the "Meerkat Manor Re-Cap" special from series 2. Discovery Channel's website also offers documentary videos featurettes about the series, top ten moments from the series, and a memorial sequence for Flower through their online video on demand system.

DVD releases
In Europe, DVD Region 2, Animal Planet International released the first three series to DVD in the form of four disk series box sets containing all 13 episodes within each series; with the first series set released by Go Entertain on 9 October 2006. For the second series set, released 5 November 2007, Demand Media took over distribution of the series. The company released the third series on 23 June 2008. In addition to the standalone series sets, the company has released an intro disc containing the first three episodes of series one and two special edition box sets: the first containing both the series 1 and 2 sets, and the second containing all three series sets.

In Region 1, which includes the United States and Canada, Animal Planet US began releasing Meerkat Manor to DVD through its on-line store on 30 November 2006. Four season sets have been released, with each set containing all 13 episodes in its respective seasons, and with an optional meerkat stuffed toy. All three seasons were also released together in an "Ultimate Fan" collection. These sets were done in Discovery's usual "burn-to-order" fashion, in which the DVDs are burned to DVD when someone places an order. As such, they were only available on Discovery's online store and through Amazon.com. On 9 October 2007, Discovery began releasing the series in regular DVD season sets, through distributor Genius Products, starting with the first season set. The company has released all four aired seasons of the series, with the final season set being released on 27 January 2009.

Notes

References
General
 

Specific

External links
 Official Discovery Channel Meerkat Manor blog with episode summaries
 

Meerkat Manor
Meerkat Manor